Alexander Yukseyev (born 5 March 1988) is a Russian professional ice hockey defenceman. He is currently playing within the SKA Saint Petersburg organization of the Kontinental Hockey League (KHL).

Yukseyev made his Kontinental Hockey League (KHL) debut playing with Avangard Omsk during the 2008–09 KHL season.

References

External links

1988 births
Living people
Russian ice hockey defencemen
Amur Khabarovsk players
Avtomobilist Yekaterinburg players
Avangard Omsk players
Severstal Cherepovets players
Sportspeople from Yekaterinburg